Jocara claudalis is a species of snout moth in the genus Jocara. It is found on Jamaica.

References

Moths described in 1886
Jocara